Michael Miller (born 31 December 1994) is a Scottish footballer who plays as a defender or defensive midfielder for Stenhousemuir. Miller was in the Celtic youth system and has since played for Dumbarton, Brechin City, Livingston and Greenock Morton and Raith Rovers.

Miller played for Scotland at under-18, under-19 and under-20 levels.

Career

Club
Miller began his youth career at Celtic, spending a short time on loan at Dumbarton in 2014. In June that same year, Miller was released by Celtic and signed for Greenock Morton on a one-year contract. Miller scored his first goal for Morton as they defeated Peterhead to win the League One title in May 2015. At the end of the 2015–16 season, Miller signed with Livingston. Miller was released by the club at the end of the 2016–17 season.

After leaving Livingston, Miller had an unsuccessful trial spell at St Mirren. He joined Brechin City during the 2018–19 season, and made his league debut on 9 March 2019. After a season with Raith Rovers, Miller joined Ayr United in 2020. Ayr loaned him to Stenhousemuir in September 2021.

Miller signed permanently for Stenhousemuir in 2022.

International
Miller made appearances for Scotland at under-18, under-19 and under-20 level in 2012 whilst at Celtic.

Honours

Club
Greenock Morton
Scottish League One: 2014–15

Livingston
Scottish League One: 2016–17

References

External links

1994 births
Living people
Footballers from Glasgow
Scottish footballers
Celtic F.C. players
Greenock Morton F.C. players
Dumbarton F.C. players
Association football defenders
Scotland youth international footballers
Scottish Professional Football League players
Livingston F.C. players
Brechin City F.C. players
Raith Rovers F.C. players
Ayr United F.C. players
Stenhousemuir F.C. players